Horace Robert "Doc" Ozmer (May 25, 1901 – December 28, 1970) was a Major League Baseball pitcher who played in 1923 with the Philadelphia Athletics.

External links

1901 births
1970 deaths
Major League Baseball pitchers
Baseball players from Atlanta
Milligan Buffaloes baseball players
Martinsburg Blue Sox players
Hanover Raiders players
Philadelphia Athletics players